Kekenodon is an extinct kekenodontid early whale from the Late Oligocene (Chattian) of New Zealand. Although at times classified as a basilosaurid, mysticete, or odontocete, recent work suggests that it represents a phylogenetic intermediate form between Basilosauridae and Neoceti.

Classification
Kekenodon was considered a member of the basilosaurid subfamily Dorudontinae in the classic monograph on Archaeoceti by Kellogg (1936).

"Squalodon" gambierensis from Australia is a close relative of Kekenodon.

Phylogenetic analysis suggests that Kekenodon is the "latest-surviving archaeocete, sister-taxon to the Neoceti."

References

Archaeoceti
Fossil taxa described in 1881
Prehistoric cetacean genera